Andrei Petrovich Kurdyumov (born 23 March 1972) is a former Kazakhstani footballer.

Career
Kurdyumov played for a number of teams based in Kazakh SSR, USSR and later Kazakhstan including Shakhtyor Karaganda, Olimpiya Alma-Ata, CSKA Alma-Ata and Montazhnik Alma-Ata, as well as for Zenit St. Petersburg and Chernomorets Novorossiysk of then Russian Top League.

International
He was capped ten times for his national team between 1994 and 1996.

References

External links
 

1972 births
Living people
Kazakhstani footballers
Kazakhstan international footballers
FC Zenit Saint Petersburg players
Kazakhstani expatriate footballers
Expatriate footballers in Russia
Russian Premier League players
Kazakhstan Premier League players
FC Chernomorets Novorossiysk players
FC Shakhter Karagandy players
FC Kairat players
Association football midfielders